The First Kurti cabinet was formed in Kosovo on 3 February 2020 following a deal between the political parties Vetëvendosje, New Democratic Party, Democratic League of Kosovo and Serb List. On 25 March 2020, the government lost a vote of no confidence that was brought by the Democratic League of Kosovo.

Actions
On 3 February 2020, Albin Kurti was confirmed as the prime minister of Kosovo by the Kosovo Assembly following the 2019 parliamentary elections with sixty six in favor and ten abstentions from the seventy six deputies who remained present after multiple opposition party deputies left the parliament in protest.

On 12 February, the cabinet reversed decisions made by the former Haradinaj cabinet to increase ministerial salaries from €1,500 to €2,950 and continue to pay ministers' salaries after the end of their mandate. The Kurti cabinet also asked parliament to extend the budget until March. On 27 February, Kurti announced a timetable for gradually removing a 100% import tariff on goods from Bosnia-Herzegovina and Serbia, "as a sign of good will and readiness to resolve the economic dispute with Serbia" and to help with the integration of Kosovo into the European Union. On 20 March, the cabinet voted ten to two in favor of removing the 100% import tariff on raw materials only. The decision was not supported by the Democratic League of Kosovo (LDK) coalition party and drew criticism from senior United States personalities as they had called for all tariffs to be removed.

On 18 March, Kurti sacked Interior Minister Agim Veliu (LDK) due to his support for declaring a state of emergency to handle the coronavirus pandemic, which would have given power to the Kosovo Security Council chaired by Hashim Thaçi (PDK). The Democratic League of Kosovo, the junior partner leader of the coalition, filed a no-confidence vote motion in retaliation for the sacking and due to other internal disagreements between the coalition members and on 25 March, eighty two members of the Kosovo Assembly voted in favor of the motion, becoming the first government to be voted out of power due to disagreements over how to handle the coronavirus pandemic.

The First Kurti cabinet continued as a caretaker government.

Composition
The cabinet consists of the following Ministers:

References 

Cabinets established in 2020
Government ministers of Kosovo
Government of Kosovo
2020 establishments in Kosovo
Cabinets disestablished in 2020
2020 disestablishments in Kosovo